Winter Colors is a studio album by the jazz group Peterson Kohler Collective, released in 2019 on Origin Records.

Content

David Peterson, Lee, and Rob Kohler are cousins who grew up in Montana. Peterson is a veteran of the Seattle jazz scene, teaching at Cornish College for 35 years. Peterson is best known for his work with Chuck Deardorf and Chet Baker. John Bishop, the drummer, is the founder of Origin Records. Brent Jensen, originally from  Idaho, is a Seattle-based saxophonist who attended college with Rob Kohler.

The album includes original compositions by every member of the band except Bishop, two freely improvised tracks ("Grey Mist" and "White Flurries"), and a song composed by the Kohler brothers' father John Kohler.

Critical reception 

Critics were generally favorable of the album, praising its balance of versatility and cohesiveness. Many critics pointed to the familial connection and maturity of the players as particularly striking. The title track was singled out as exemplary of the album's signature sound, but the compositions were widely praised.

Track listing

Personnel

David Peterson - guitar
Brent Jensen - saxophone
Lee Kohler - piano
Rob Kohler - double bass and electric bass
John Bishop - drums

References

External links 
 Album website
 Artist page

2019 albums
Jazz albums by American artists